Rajpura is a village in Phillaur, a city in the district Jalandhar of Indian state of Punjab.

Geography 
Rajpura lies on the Goraya-Masani Banga road which is almost 1 km from it.  The nearest railway station to Rajpura is Goraya railway station at a distance of 8 km.

Post code 
Rajpura Post office is Apra.

References 

  Official website of Punjab Govt. with Rajpura's details

Villages in Jalandhar district